Panzerpappa is a contemporary Norwegian progressive rock band based in Oslo.

Biography 
The band plays instrumental RIO or progressive rock with a humoristic twist ("Progressive Rock with a friendly face", in their own words), which is often reminiscent of inspirational precursors such as Samla Mammas Manna, King Crimson, Henry Cow, Univers Zero, Happy The Man and Frank Zappa.

Panzerpappa have released five studio albums since their inception in 1998.

Members 
 Steinar Børve (saxophones, keyboards)
 Trond Gjellum (drums, percussion, samplers and several other instruments and sounds)
 Anders Krabberød (bass guitars, Chapman Stick, ekstra keyboards)
 Jarle Storløkken (guitars, keyboards, accordion)
 Torgeir Wergeland Sørbye (keyboards, trumpet)

Discography 

Albums
2000: Passer Gullfisk (Panzerpappa)
2002: Hulemysteriet (Panzerpappa)
2004: Farlig Vandring (Avant Audio Productions)
2006: Koralrevens Klagesang (Schmell Records)
2012: Astromalist (Rune Grammofon)
2016: Pestrottedans (AltrOck Records)
2019: Summarisk Suite (Apollon Records)

References

External links 

Norwegian progressive rock groups
Norwegian alternative rock groups
Norwegian psychedelic rock music groups
Musical groups established in 1998
1998 establishments in Norway
Musical groups from Oslo
Harvest Records artists